Belgium is scheduled to compete at the 2019 Summer Universiade in Naples, Italy from 3 to 14 July 2019. A total of 41 athletes will compete.

Athletics

Fencing

Gymnastics

Artistic gymnastics

Rhythmic Gymnastics

Judo

Rugby sevens

Shooting

Swimming

Table tennis

Taekwondo

References

Nations at the 2019 Summer Universiade
Summer Universiade
2019